The Billboard Hot 100 is a chart that ranks the best-performing songs in the United States. Its data, published by Billboard magazine and compiled by Nielsen SoundScan, is based collectively on each song's weekly physical and digital sales, as well as the amount of airplay received on American radio stations and streaming on online digital music outlets.

During 2018, eleven singles reached number one on the Hot 100; a twelfth single, "Perfect" by Ed Sheeran, solo or duet with Beyoncé, began its run at number one in December 2017. Of those eleven number-one singles, four were collaborations. In total, thirteen acts topped the chart as either lead or featured artists, with nine—Camila Cabello, Young Thug, Childish Gambino, Ty Dolla Sign, XXXTentacion, Bad Bunny, J Balvin, Ariana Grande and Travis Scott—achieving their first Hot 100 number-one single. Drake's "God's Plan" was the longest-running number-one of the year, leading the chart for eleven weeks; it subsequently topped the Billboard Year-End Hot 100. Drake beat the record for most weeks at number one in a year for a single artist, with 29 weeks at number one. XXXTentacion became the first artist to have a posthumous number one since Static Major featured on Lil Wayne's "Lollipop" in 2008 and the first artist to lead the chart with a posthumous number one since The Notorious B.I.G.'s Hypnotize in 1997, and is the eighth overall.

Drake and Cardi B were the only acts to have multiple number one songs in 2018, with Drake having the most with three and Cardi B with two.

Chart history

Number-one artists

See also 
2018 in American music
List of Billboard 200 number-one albums of 2018
List of Billboard Hot 100 top-ten singles in 2018
Billboard Year-End Hot 100 singles of 2018

Notes

References 

United States Hot 100
2018
Hot 100 number-one singles